Released in 2002, Frisbee is the fourth studio album from the Venezuelan Latin rock band Caramelos de Cianuro. Being very different from their previous albums, this one shows a great deal of musical maturity and an internationalization of their sounds, not being anymore just a Venezuelan band, but one known beyond their country's borders.

Frisbee joins the toughness of rock with the subtlety of pop, thanks to the influence of producer Enrique Gonzalez Müller, who has worked with bands like Nine Inch Nails, Joe Satriani and The Dave Matthews Band, and their willingness to accept his instructions when playing their instruments.

Members
 Asier Cazalís (Vocalist)
 Alfonso Tosta (Drummer)
 Luis Barrios (Bassist)
 Miguel González "El Enano" (Guitarist)

Track listing
 Sanitarios
 El Mar
 Retrovisor
 Las Notas 
 El Ultimo Polvo
 Surfer Girl
 La Terraza
 Dolor y Pasion
 Incertidumbre
 Ojos Halogenos
 Al Comienzo

2002 albums
Caramelos de Cianuro albums

Frisbee (álbum)